Qalidurut was the King of Makuria during 7th Century. He is mostly known for his victories against Rashidun Caliphate in the First and Second Battle of Dongola.

Reign
Very little is known about Qalidurut, the first mention of the king comes from Arab sources. After his victory against Abdallah ibn Sa'd in the Second Battle of Dongola he signed Baqt to keep peace between Makuria and Rashidun Caliphate and it regulated Makuria's political and economic relations with the caliphate for the next 520 years. After the treaty was signed Qalidurut and his son Zacharias rebuilt a Cathedral in Dongola destroyed during the war. He also built a cruciform building in the city in commemoration of the defenders of Dongola. The city of Dongola experienced prosperity under their reign.

References

7th-century monarchs in Africa